Tom Parsons (born 25 June 1990) is a New Zealand rugby union player, who currently plays as a lock for  in New Zealand's domestic National Provincial Championship competition and the  in Super Rugby.

Early career and personal life

Parsons attended Lindisfarne College (2004-2008) and is a former player and captain of the college's 1st XV team. He's the son of former  loose forward Rod Parsons (1988-1989, 18 games). His brother Ben Parsons also played 3 games at lock for the Magpies in 2017. Former All Blacks and Blues hooker James Parsons is his cousin.

Senior career

Parsons was – for the first time – named in the Hawke's Bay squad ahead of the 2012 ITM Cup season. In his first three seasons, he played 15 games for the province.

He debuted for the Turbos on 16 August 2015 against . He played 29 games for Manawatū in three seasons.

Parsons returned to Hawke's Bay and was named in the Magpies squad for the 2018 Mitre 10 Cup season. That season turned out to become his breakout season, in which he became a regular starter for Hawke's Bay. On 23 October 2018, Parsons won the Magpies Player of the Year award and Forward of the Year award at the team's end-of-season awards function.

On 27 November 2019, Japanese club Toshiba Brave Lupus announced the signing of Parsons on a six-month contract for their 2020 Top League season. He made his debut for the club on 18 January 2020 in a game against NTT DoCoMo Red Hurricanes. He played only four games for the side because the 2020 Top League season was cancelled after round 6 due to the COVID-19 pandemic.

He returned to Hawke's Bay for the 2020 Mitre 10 Cup season, which turned out to be a successful one. The Magpies won the Ranfurly Shield, successfully defended the Shield three times and won the Mitre 10 Cup Championship, thus securing a well-deserved promotion to the Premiership division. The Magpies held on to the Shield during the entire 2021 Bunnings NPC season, winning all six Ranfurly Shield defences. Parsons captained the team in the last few rounds of the season, after long-term captain Ash Dixon had left to play in Japan.

During the 2021 Super Rugby season, he was called into the  squad as short-term injury cover, but didn't get any game time.

While not being named in the initial  squad for the 2022 Super Rugby Pacific season, Parsons was eventually offered a contract and joined the franchise during preseason. He made his Super Rugby debut for the Hurricanes – off the bench – on 25 March 2022 against . His starting debut followed in the return game against Moana Pasifika on 12 April 2022.

Reference list

External links
NZ Rugby History profile
Itsrugby.co.uk profile

1990 births
Living people
People educated at Lindisfarne College, New Zealand
New Zealand rugby union players
Rugby union players from the Hawke's Bay Region
Rugby union locks
Hawke's Bay rugby union players
Manawatu rugby union players 
Toshiba Brave Lupus Tokyo players
Hurricanes (rugby union) players